J.U.L.I.A. is an indie video game developed by CBE Software. It is an adventure game with a heavy emphasis on puzzles, mini-games and menu-based interfaces. The game is set in 2430 when a scientific expedition is sent to a distant star system.

Story
The game centers on three characters – Astrobiologist Rachel Manners, the ship's artificially intelligent computer J.U.L.I.A. and a remote-controlled landing craft MOBOT. Rachel is awakened by J.U.L.I.A. from cryogenic sleep and finds out that other members of the expedition are dead. She starts to investigate what happened. It takes her all over the solar system. She is helped by MOBOT who provides an exploration on planets and by J.U.L.I.A. who helps her with multiple puzzles.

Reception
The game received mixed reviews from critics who praised the story, puzzles, graphics and music, but criticized its gameplay, which many found boring.

The game earned two Aggie Awards nominations in 2012. It was nominated in category for the best character (for character of MOBOT) and the best gameplay. It won neither.

Related games
A spin-off game, J.U.L.I.A. Untold, was later released. The game starts with discovering a partially destroyed backup database.

Developers later started to work on J.U.L.I.A. Among the Stars. It was originally planned to be the Enhanced Edition of the game but thanks to success on Indiegogo, it became a remake with  much different gameplay and story. The release date was 12 October 2014.

References

External links
 CBE Software site

Adventure games
Puzzle video games
Indie video games
Linux games
Windows games
MacOS games
Video games developed in the Czech Republic
Science fiction video games
Video games featuring female protagonists
Video games with alternate endings
2012 video games